Lærdal is a municipality in Vestland county, Norway. It is located on the south side of the Sognefjorden in the traditional district of Sogn. The administrative center of the municipality is the village of Lærdalsøyri. The old Filefjell Kongevegen road passes through Lærdal on its way to Valdres and later to Oslo.

The  municipality is the 71st largest by area out of the 356 municipalities in Norway (with over half of this area consisting of mountains). Lærdal is the 274th most populous municipality in Norway with a population of 2,117.

The Lærdal river valley is long, running from Hemsedal (Høgeloft mountain) and the Filefjell mountains in the east to the Sognefjorden in the west. About half of the municipal residents live in the main village of Lærdalsøyri; the rest in the small villages in the surrounding valleys such as Borgund, Ljøsne, Tønjum, Erdal, Vindedalen, Frønningen, and Strendene. The Old Lærdalsøyri village has 161 protected buildings. Some of the houses there date back to the mid-18th century. On the night of 18–19 January 2014, a major fire destroyed at least 30 buildings.

General information

Lærdal was established as a municipality on 1 January 1838 (see formannskapsdistrikt law). In the 19th century, the name was sometimes spelled Leerdahl or Leirdal. The municipality of 1838 was created to be identical to the Lærdal parish (prestegjeld) that included the sub-parishes of Borgund, Tønjum, Hauge, and Aardal. In 1863, the northeastern sub-parish of Aardal (population: 1,791) was separated from Lærdal to form a separate municipality. In 1864, the eastern sub-parish of Borgund (population: 963) was separated from Lærdal to form its own municipality. This left Lærdal with 2,777 residents.

During the 1960s, there were many municipal mergers across Norway due to the work of the Schei Committee. On 1 January 1964, Lærdal (population: 1,755) was merged with the municipality of Borgund (population: 492) and the Muggeteigen, Luggenes, and Bergmål farms (population: 11) along the Sognefjorden from the municipality of Årdal. After the merger, Lærdal had a total of 2,258. On 1 January 1992, the Frønningen area (population: 32) of Leikanger Municipality was transferred to Lærdal municipality.

On 1 January 2020, the municipality became part of the newly created Vestland county after Sogn og Fjordane and Hordaland counties were merged.

Name
The Old Norse form of the name was Lærardalr. The first element is the genitive case of the old name of the river Lærr (now the river is called Lærdalselvi) and the last element is dalr which means "valley" or "dale." The meaning of the old river name is unknown.

Coat of arms
The coat of arms was granted on 18 December 1987. It is red with two gold-colored Norse dragon heads. The dragon heads are based on the wooden dragons seen on the gables of the historic Borgund Stave Church in Lærdal.

Churches
The Church of Norway has three parishes within the municipality of Lærdal. It is part of the Sogn prosti (deanery) in the Diocese of Bjørgvin.

Government
All municipalities in Norway, including Lærdal, are responsible for primary education (through 10th grade), outpatient health services, senior citizen services, unemployment and other social services, zoning, economic development, and municipal roads. The municipality is governed by a municipal council of elected representatives, which in turn elect a mayor.  The municipality falls under the Sogn og Fjordane District Court and the Gulating Court of Appeal.

Municipal council
The municipal council  of Lærdal is made up of 17 representatives that are elected to four year terms. The party breakdown of the council is as follows:

Mayor
The mayor  of a municipality in Norway is a representative of the majority party of the municipal council who is elected to lead the council. The mayors of Lærdal (incomplete list):
2019–present: Audun Mo (Ap)
2011–2019: Jan Geir Solheim (Sp)
2007–2011: Arne Sanden (Ap)
2003–2007: Knut O. Aarethun (Ap)

Twin towns – Sister cities
Lærdal has sister city agreements with the following places:
  Jericho, Palestine (since 1998)

Geography

Lærdal is located southeast of the Sognefjorden and east of the Aurlandsfjorden. The municipality is centered on the Lærdalselvi River with the Filefjell and Hemsedalsfjell mountain ranges on its east. Lærdal is bordered in Vestland county by the municipality of Aurland to the southwest, Sogndal to the northwest, and Årdal to the north. It is also bordered on the east by Vang (Innlandet county) and Hemsedal (Viken county), and in the south by Ål and Hol (both in Viken county).

The lakes Eldrevatnet, Juklevatnet, and Øljusjøen are located along the southeastern border, south of the mountain Høgeloft.

Climate
Lærdal is situated near the head of Sognefjorden. The very long fjord snakes past mountain ranges on its way from the sea inland to Lærdal, and the mountains create a rain shadow effect for the innermost part of the fjord, making Lærdal much drier than the coast, with just 20% of Bergen's precipitation. The mountains also sometimes gives a föhn effect in winter for Lærdal. The climate of Lærdal is a thus a mix of oceanic and continental features. The record high  was recorded both July 2018 and July 2019. The all-time low  is from January 1942.

Lærdal tunnel
The Lærdalstunnel was built through the Aurlandsfjell mountains dividing Aurland from Lærdal. Construction began in 1995 and was completed in 2000.

Lærdalselvi river

The River  was traditionally one of the most exclusive salmon and sea trout rivers in Norway. Known by the Norwegian King Harald V as his second Queen, the river has established Lærdal as one of the meccas of salmon and sea trout fly fishing, among others for the unusual fact that the river offers daylight fishing and dry fly fishing for sea trout. The salmon population was drastically depleted after an infestation with the salmon parasite Gyrodactylus salaris in the fall of 1996. After several treatments with aluminium sulfate, there are still problems with the parasite. In fall 2007, a smolt was again found infected by the parasite, and new treatments started in late March 2008. Because of this parasite, the river was closed to angling for the 2008 season.

The river has formed a large delta at Lærdalsøyri, where huge amounts of silt and sand have been deposited by the river. Although the area has been spoiled by some unfortunate landfills it is still a sight worth seeing.

Economy
Lærdal has long traditions in farming, with the lower region of the valley being great for vegetable crops. Because of its dry climate it was one of the first places in Norway to begin the use of artificial irrigation. Despite having an inland climate, the water in the fjord keeps the winters from getting too cold.

The local Western Norway Regional Health Authority hospital provides medical care for Lærdal itself and seven of the surrounding municipalities. The hospital, together with Opplysningen 1881 (directory assistance company), Østfold Energiproduksjon A/S and Norsk Hydro Aluminium Production Facilities in Årdal, are the major employers in Lærdal. The local government and health authority is trying to close this hospital due to cost cutting, which may have negative effects on the area.

Notable people 

 Peder Hjermann (1754 in Lærdal – 1834) farmer, elected to the Norwegian Constitutional Assembly
 Anders Olson Lysne (1764 – executed 1803) farmer, led the Lærdal farmers' rebellion, 1800 to 1802
 Jan Henrik Nitter Hansen (1801–1879) a businessman and politician, Mayor of Lærdal, 1850's
 Per Lysne (1880 in Lærdal – 1947) a Norwegian-American artist, brought Rosemaling folk art to the USA
 Eivind Blehr (1881 in Lærdal – 1957) politician, Minister in Quisling's government during WWII
 Knut Rumohr (1916 in Lærdal – 2002) a Norwegian painter and printmaker
 Knut O. Aarethun (born 1942 in Lærdalsøyri) politician, Mayor of Lærdal, 2003 to 2007
 Ragnhild Sælthun Fjørtoft (born 1947 in Lærdal) a Norwegian former TV presenter
 Øyvind Hegg-Lunde (born 1982 in Lærdal) musician, plays drums and percussion, raised in Borgund

Photo gallery

References

External links

Official website: Lærdal Kommune 
Municipal fact sheet from Statistics Norway 
NRK: Fylkesleksikon – Lærdal Kommune 

 
Municipalities of Vestland
1838 establishments in Norway